'Pauline Jameson' (5 June 1920 - 8 April 2007) was an English actress whose work encompassed stage and screen. The Times called her 'one of the most distinguished classical actresses of her generation.'

After starting in weekly rep at Colwyn Bay in 1937, she graduated from RADA in 1940, and made her  West End debut as  Lucy in The Rivals at the Criterion Theatre in 1945. She joined the Old Vic Company for the 1948-49 season, with roles including Maria in Twelfth Night, Marwood in The Way of the World and Dunyasha in The Cherry Orchard. Other distinguished theatre work followed, including as Regan in Peter Brook's production of King Lear with Paul Scofield for the Royal Shakespeare Company in 1962.  She also worked in the West End and at the National Theatre. Jameson received the Clarence Derwent Award for her role as Mrs. Prest in the London stage adaptation of Henry James' The Aspern Papers in 1959. She appeared alongside Michael Redgrave in Arthur Watkyn's comedy Out of Bounds in 1962.

She made her film debut in Esther Waters in 1948, and throughout her lengthy career made many appearances on screen, mainly on television. Her TV credits include: One Step Beyond, Armchair Theatre, No Hiding Place, ITV Play of the Week,  Emergency Ward 10, Callan, Public Eye,  Play of the Month, The Spoils of Poynton, The Woman in White, Hadleigh, Lillie and Poirot.

Filmography
 Esther Waters (1948) - Hospital Nurse (as Pauline Jamieson)
 Once a Jolly Swagman (1949) - Mrs. Lewis
 The Queen of Spades (1949) - Anyutka
 The Black Knight (1954) - Lady Yeonil
 The Millionairess (1960) - Muriel
 Two Living, One Dead (1961) - Miss Larsen
 Crooks Anonymous (1962) - Sister Prunella
 I Could Go On Singing (1963) - Miss Plimpton
 The Punch and Judy Man (1963) - Mayoress
 Doctor in Distress (1963) - Ward sister
 Murder Most Foul (1964) - Maureen Summers
 Sky West and Crooked (1966) - Mrs. Moss
Night Watch (1973) - Secretary
 Joseph Andrews (1977) - Lady Tittle
 Full Circle (1977) - Claudia Branscombe

References

External links
 

1920 births
2007 deaths
English stage actresses
English film actresses
English television actresses
Alumni of RADA